Visions of the Universe is a book written by Isaac Asimov and illustrated by Kazuaki Iwasaki in 1981. It was edited by Carl Sagan. Following the success of his best-selling book Cosmos, Sagan set up his own publishing firm, Cosmos Store, in order to publish science books for the general public. Visions of the Universe was one of the books this short-lived firm published.

References

External links
 Book Overview. Google Books Search. Retrieved 30 June 2009.

Books by Isaac Asimov
1981 non-fiction books
Books about visual art